This is a list of Punjabi films scheduled to be released or released in 2023.

Box office collection
The highest-grossing Pollywood films released in 2023, by worldwide box office gross revenue, are as follows:

January–June

See also
 List of Punjabi films of 2022
 List of Punjabi films
 2023 in film
 List of Indian films of 2023

References

External links
 Upcoming Punjabi films

2023
Films
Punjabi